PSPS U-21, an acronym for Persatuan Sepak Bola Pekanbaru dan Sekitarnya Under-21 is an Indonesian football team based in Pekanbaru. They compete in the division of Indonesian football, Liga Indonesia. In media, the club is often referred as the tautology PSPS Pekanbaru.

Kit supplier
 Lotto (2009 – present)

References

External links
  Unofficial Website PSPS Pekanbaru 
  FACEBOOK PSPS PEKANBARU 
  PSPS KEBANGGAANKU 
  Blog PSPS Pekanbaru 
  Blog Asykar Theking
  Facebook PSPS

Pekanbaru
Football clubs in Indonesia

id:PSPS Pekanbaru